Events during the year 1972 in Northern Ireland.

Incumbents
 Governor – The Lord Grey of Naunton
 Prime Minister – Brian Faulkner (until 30 March) 
Secretary of State – William Whitelaw (from 24 March)

Events
17 January – The "West Belfast Seven" Provisional Irish Republican Army (IRA) internees escape from prison ship Maidstone moored in Belfast Lough by swimming ashore.
30 January - Bloody Sunday: Thirteen unarmed civilians are shot dead in Derry as British paratroopers open fire on a banned civil rights march. A fourteenth, John Johnston, is also to die some months later after having been shot by a paratrooper.
9 February – A day of disruption takes place in Northern Ireland as people take to the streets in protest.
12 February – William Craig launches the Ulster Vanguard movement in Lisburn.
22 February – 1972 Aldershot Bombing: The Official Irish Republican Army detonates a bomb outside the headquarters of the British Army's 16th Parachute Brigade in Aldershot, England, killing 7 and injuring 17.
22 March – Bomb explodes near Europa Hotel, Belfast.
28 March – Northern Ireland Parliament suspended after Prime Minister Brian Faulkner resigns. Direct rule introduced.
19 April – A report by the Lord Chief Justice, Lord Widgery, into the Bloody Sunday shootings exonerates the British troops of blame because the demonstration had been illegal.
30 May – The Official Irish Republican Army declares a ceasefire in Northern Ireland.
3 June – A Protestant demonstration in Derry against the creation of "no-go" areas in the city ends in violence.
13–14 June – The Provisional Irish Republican Army proposes a ceasefire. The Social Democratic and Labour Party (SDLP), as intermediaries, make offer to British, who accept terms.
9 July – End of British–IRA ceasefire.
19 July – A five-month-old boy, Alan Jack, was killed when an IRA car bomb exploded on Canal Street in Strabane. He was the youngest victim of the Troubles up to that point.
21 July – Bloody Friday: Nine people die and over one hundred are injured in a series of Provisional IRA explosions in Belfast city centre.
31 July
 Operation Motorman, 4:00 AM: British Army begins to regain control of the "no-go areas" established by Irish republican paramilitaries in Belfast, Derry ("Free Derry") and Newry.
 Claudy bombing ("Bloody Monday"), 10:00 AM: Three car bombs in Claudy, County Londonderry, kill six immediately with three dying later in hospital. It becomes public knowledge only in 2010 that a local Catholic priest was an IRA officer believed to be involved in the bombings but his role was covered up by the authorities.
July – Shankill Butchers begin killing Catholics.
10 September – Three British soldiers are killed and four injured when the IRA blows up their Saracen armoured personnel carrier at Sanaghanroe near Dungannon.
25 September - Darlington conference on the future of Northern Ireland opens.
 28 December - Belturbet Co Cavan Geraldine O'Reilly 15 from Cavan and Patrick Stanley 16 from Offaly murdered by an unclaimed bomb.
1972 is the worst year for casualties in The Troubles, with 479 people killed (including 130 British soldiers) and 4,876 injured.

Arts and literature
The Planning (Northern Ireland) Order first provides for listed buildings in Northern Ireland.
Seamus Deane's poetry Gradual Wars is published.

Sport

Athletics
Olympics (Munich)
Pentathlon: Mary Peters becomes the first Irish woman to win a gold medal at the Olympic Games.

Football
Irish League
Winners: Glentoran

Irish Cup
Winners: Coleraine 2 – 1 Portadown

On 13 October 1972 Derry City withdraws from senior football in the Irish League due to security problems in the Brandywell Stadium area.

Motorcycling
Ulster Grand Prix cancelled due to the political situation.

Snooker
Alex Higgins wins the World Professional Snooker Championship.

Births
15 January – Derek Heasley, cricketer.
24 January – Éamonn Burns, Gaelic footballer.
12 February – Owen Nolan, ice hockey player.
6 March – Terry Murphy, snooker player.
24 April – Sinéad Morrissey, poet.
27 May – Maggie O'Farrell, novelist.
21 June – Neil Doak, cricketer and rugby player.
9 July – Darren Corbett, boxer.
6 September – Gary Arbuthnot, flautist.
1 November
Kevin Horlock, soccer player.
Gillian Sewell, field hockey player in Canada.
24 November – Iain Jenkins, soccer player.
28 November – Bronagh Gallagher, actress and singer.

Deaths
22 February – Eva McGown, Official Hostess of Fairbanks and Honorary Hostess of Alaska (born 1883).
15 April – Joe McCann, Official Irish Republican Army volunteer killed by British soldiers (born 1947).

See also
1972 in Scotland
1972 in Wales

References

 
Northern Ireland